Treprostinil, sold under the brand names Remodulin for infusion, Orenitram for oral, and Tyvaso for inhalation, is a vasodilator that is used for the treatment of  pulmonary arterial hypertension. Treprostinil is a synthetic analog of prostacyclin (PGI2).

Treprostinil was approved for use in the United States in May 2002.

The drug can be given in various forms: IV, subcutaneous injection, oral inhalation, as well as oral extended-release tablets. The subcutaneous administration tends to be very painful.

Medical uses 

Treprostinil is indicated for the treatment of pulmonary arterial hypertension in people with NYHA Class II-IV symptoms to diminish symptoms associated with exercise. It may be administered as a continuous subcutaneous infusion or continuous intravenous infusion; however, because of the risks associated with chronic indwelling central venous catheters, including serious blood stream infections, continuous intravenous infusion should be reserved for patients who are intolerant of the subcutaneous route, or in whom these risks are considered warranted. This medication is also available in inhaled and tablet forms.

In people with pulmonary arterial hypertension requiring transition from epoprostenol sodium (Flolan), treprostinil is indicated to diminish the rate of clinical deterioration. The risks and benefits of each drug should be carefully considered prior to transition.

Treprostinil therapy may be effective in treating Degos disease.

Adverse effects 

 Since treprostinil is a vasodilator, its antihypertensive effect may be compounded by other medications that affect the blood pressure, including calcium channel blockers, diuretics, and other vasodilating agents.
 Because of treprostinil's inhibiting effect on platelet aggregation, there is an increased risk of bleeding, especially among patients who are also taking anticoagulants.
 It is not known whether treprostinil is excreted in breast milk. Caution is advised when administering this medication to nursing women.
 Caution is advised when administering treprostinil to patients who have impaired kidney or liver function.

Common side effects depending on route of administration:
 85% of patients report pain or other reaction at the infusion site. Other side effects may include headache, cough, throat irritation, diarrhea, nausea, rash, jaw pain, vasodilatation, dizziness, edema (swelling), pruritus (itching), and hypotension.

Warnings:

 Abrupt interruption of the treprostinil infusion can lead to worsening of pulmonary hypertension symptoms, and should be avoided.

Pharmacology

Mechanism of action 

Treprostinil binds to the IP receptor in the lung tissue which will cause G protein activation and lead to three major effects: vasodilation, decreased cell proliferation and inhibition of platelet aggregation.

Pharmacokinetics 

The pharmacokinetics of continuous subcutaneous treprostinil are linear over the dose range of 1.25 to 125 ng/kg/min (corresponding to plasma concentrations of about 15 pg/mL to 18,250 pg/m) and can be described by a two-compartment model. Dose proportionality at infusion rates greater than 125 ng/kg/min has not been studied.

Treprostinil is substantially metabolized by the liver, but the involved enzymes are not currently known. Five metabolites (HU1 through HU5) have been described thus far. Based on the results of in vitro human hepatic cytochrome P450 studies, Remodulin does not inhibit CYP-1A2, 2C9, 2C19, 2D6, 2E1, or 3A. Whether Remodulin induces these enzymes has not been studied.

Dosage and administration

For infusion
Treprostinil may be administered as a continuous subcutaneous infusion or continuous intravenous infusion via a small infusion pump that the patient must wear at all times. Treprostinil can be given subcutaneously by continuous infusion using an infusion set connected to an infusion pump, but also may be given intravenously via a central venous catheter if the patient is unable to tolerate subcutaneous administration because of severe site pain or reaction.

Remodulin is supplied in 20 mL vials, containing treprostinil in concentrations of 1 mg/mL, 2.5 mg/mL, 5 mg/mL, and 10 mg/mL. Treprostinil can be administered subcutaneously as supplied. It must be diluted for intravenous infusion with either sterile water or a 0.9% sodium chloride solution prior to administration.

The infusion rate is normally initiated at 1.25 ng/kg/min for new patients, but may be reduced to 0.625 ng/kg/min if the normal rate provokes unwanted side effects in the patient. The infusion rate of treprostinil should be increased no more than 1.25 ng/kg/min per week for the first month, then 2.5 ng/kg/min per week for the remaining duration of infusion. The infusion rate should ideally be high enough to improve symptoms of pulmonary hypertension, while minimizing unpleasant side effects (headache, nausea, emesis, restlessness, anxiety and infusion site pain or reaction). Dosage adjustments may be undertaken more often if tolerated. There is little experience with doses >40 ng/kg/min. Abrupt cessation of infusion should be avoided. Restarting a Remodulin infusion within a few hours after an interruption can be done using the same dose rate. Interruptions for longer periods may require the dose of Remodulin to be re-titrated.

In patients with mild or moderate liver dysfunction, the initial dose of Remodulin should be decreased to 0.625 ng/kg/min ideal body weight and should be increased cautiously. Remodulin has not been studied in patients with severe liver dysfunction.

No studies have been performed in patients with kidney dysfunction. No specific advice about dosing in patients with renal impairment can be given.

Inhaled form
The inhaled form of treprostinil was approved by the FDA in July 2009 and is marketed as the trade name Tyvaso.  The inhaled form is used with a proprietary inhalation device supplied by the manufacturer.  Patients use one ampule with inhalation solution a day, four times a day at least four hours apart.

Oral form
The oral form of treprostinil was approved by the FDA in December 2013 and is marketed as the trade name Orenitram. Orenitram is taken 2 or 3 times daily with food.

History

During the 1960s a U.K. research team, headed by Professor John Vane  began to explore the role of prostaglandins in anaphylaxis and respiratory diseases.  Working with a team from the Royal College of Surgeons, Vane discovered that aspirin and other oral anti-inflammatory drugs worked by inhibiting the synthesis of prostaglandins. This finding opened the door to a broader understanding of the role of prostaglandins in the body.

Vane and a team from the Wellcome Foundation had identified a lipid mediator they called “PG-X,” which inhibited platelet aggregation.  PG-X, which later would become known as prostacyclin, was 30 times more potent than any other known anti-aggregatory agent.

By 1976, Vane and fellow researcher Salvador Moncada published the first paper on prostacyclin, in the scientific journal Nature.  The collaboration produced a synthetic molecule which was given the name epoprostenol.  But like native prostacyclin, the structure of the epoprostenol molecule proved to be unstable in solution, prone to rapid degradation.  This presented a challenge for both in vitro experiments and clinical applications.  To overcome this challenge, the research team that discovered prostacyclin was determined to continue the research in an attempt to build upon the success they had seen with the prototype molecule. The research team synthesized nearly 1,000 analogs.

Remodulin was approved for use in the United States in May 2002, and again in July 2018. Tyvaso, the inhaled form of treprostinil, was approved for use in the United States in July 2009. Orenitram was approved in December 2013.

Trepulmix was approved for use in the European Union in April 2020.

Effect on PPARs
Treprostinil has demonstrated an effect on PPAR-γ, a transcription factor important in vascular pathogenesis as a mediator of proliferation, inflammation and apoptosis.  Through a complementary, yet cyclic AMP-independent pathway, treprostinil activates PPARs, another mechanism that contributes to the anti-growth benefits of the prostacyclin class.

References

Further reading

External links
 

Acetic acids
Orphan drugs
Phenol ethers
Prostaglandins
Secondary alcohols